Panada or panado is a variety of bread soup found in some Western European and Southern European cuisines and consisting of stale bread boiled to a pulp in water or other liquids.

In British cuisine, it may be flavoured with sugar, Zante currants, nutmeg, and so on. A version of panada was a favorite dish of the author Percy Bysshe Shelley, who was a vegetarian. It was considered a light dish suitable for invalids or women who had just given birth.

In French cuisine, it is often enriched with butter, milk, cream, or egg yolk.

In northeastern Italy, it serves as an inexpensive meal in the poor areas of the countryside.  It may be enriched with eggs, beef broth, and grated cheese. Traditionally, it was frequently prepared as a meal for elderly or ill people.

In Spanish cuisine, it is made by boiling bread in water or milk and adding flavoring.

See also
Panade (disambiguation)
 List of bread dishes
 List of Italian soups
 List of soups
 Acquacotta (or pancotta)
Ribollita
 Pappa al pomodoro
 Empanada

Notes 

Italian soups
Bread dishes
Bread soups